These are the Billboard magazine R&B albums that reached number-one in 1997.

Chart history

See also
1997 in music
R&B number-one hits of 1997 (USA)

1997
United States R and B albums